Sir Carl Douglas Aarvold,  (7 June 1907 – 17 March 1991), was an English barrister who became Recorder of London. Among other cases, he presided at the 1965 trial of the Kray twins. In his earlier days, he was also an England rugby union international player

Born in Hartlepool, he was educated at Durham School and Emmanuel College, Cambridge and from 1928 until 1933 played rugby 16 times for his country, captaining the side six times. He was called to the bar in 1932. Two years later he married Noeline Hill at St George's, Hanover Square, and the marriage yielded three sons.

His professional career was interrupted by World War II during which he served in the Royal Artillery and reached the temporary rank of lieutenant-colonel. He was appointed Officer of the Order of the British Empire (OBE) in 1945 for his war service and also received the Territorial Decoration

Embarking on a legal career, he was by 1951 the Recorder of Pontefract and then Judge of the Lord Mayor's and City of London Court (later Common Serjeant). By now Master of the Inner Temple he succeeded Edward Anthony Hawke to be Recorder of London, the Senior Judge at The Old Bailey in 1964, and was knighted in 1968. A long-serving president of the Lawn Tennis Association, he died on 17 March 1991; his wife died in 2005.

In 1966, he received the Grand Decoration of Honour in Silver for Services to the Republic of Austria.

Notes

1907 births
1991 deaths
Alumni of Emmanuel College, Cambridge
Alumni of the Inns of Court School of Law
British & Irish Lions rugby union players from England
British Army personnel of World War II
Cambridge University R.U.F.C. players
Common Serjeants of London
England international rugby union players
English barristers
20th-century English judges
English rugby union players
Fellows of Emmanuel College, Cambridge
Knights Bachelor
Military personnel from County Durham
Members of the Inner Temple
Officers of the Order of the British Empire
People educated at Durham School
Recipients of the Grand Decoration for Services to the Republic of Austria
Recorders of London
Royal Artillery officers
Rugby players and officials awarded knighthoods
Rugby union players from Hartlepool
West Hartlepool R.F.C. players
Rugby union centres